Eucetotherium is a genus of cetotheriid mysticete from Miocene (Tortonian) marine deposits in the Russian Caucasus.

References 

Baleen whales
Miocene cetaceans
Prehistoric cetacean genera
Fossil taxa described in 1873
Miocene mammals of Europe